This a list of islands under the jurisdiction of Cebu in the Philippines.

References

Cebu